Rosie is a 1973 album by British folk rock band Fairport Convention, their eighth album since their debut in 1968.

The album was the first to include Australian singer-songwriter-guitarist Trevor Lucas and American lead guitarist Jerry Donahue. Both had previously played with ex-Fairport Sandy Denny, whom Lucas later married, in the short-lived Fotheringay. Here they had effectively replaced Simon Nicol who had quit Fairport to join another ex-member Ashley Hutchings in The Albion Band, thus leaving the band with no founding members until he rejoined in 1976.

Drummer Dave Mattacks also joined the Albion Band for a while but rejoined during the making of Rosie. He only plays on four of the ten tracks; on others, drums are handled alternately by Tim Donald and Gerry Conway. Like Donahue and Lucas, Conway was also ex-Fotheringay, and would himself join Fairport in 1998, becoming the band's drummer until his retirement in 2022

Track listing

Side one
 "Rosie" (Dave Swarbrick)
 "Matthew, Mark, Luke & John" (Dave Pegg, Dave Swarbrick)
 "Knights of the Road" (Trevor Lucas, Peter Roche)
 "Peggy's Pub" (Dave Pegg)
 "The Plainsman" (words: Peter Roche; music: Traditional, arranged by Trevor Lucas)

Side two
 "Hungarian Rhapsody" (Dave Pegg)
 "My Girl" (Dave Swarbrick)
 "Me with You" (Dave Swarbrick)
 "The Hens March Through the Midden & The Four Poster Bed" (Traditional, arranged by Fairport Convention)
 "Furs and Feathers" (Dave Swarbrick)

A 2004 Island issue, in addition to the previous tracks, featured also the following bonus tracks recorded live on 23 April 1973 at The Howff in London:

 "Matthew, Mark, Luke & John" (Dave Pegg, Dave Swarbrick)
 "The Hens March Through the Midden & The Four Poster Bed" (Traditional, arranged by Fairport Convention)
 "Rosie" (remix)
 "The Claw" (Jerry Reed)
 "Furs and Feathers" (Dave Swarbrick)

Personnel
Fairport Convention
Dave Swarbrick - vocals, fiddle, viola, mandolin (4), acoustic guitar (7)
Trevor Lucas - vocals, 6 and 12-string acoustic guitars
Jerry Donahue - guitars, backing vocals
Dave Pegg - vocals, bass, mandolin (4)
Dave Mattacks - drums (4,9,10), percussion (8), piano (6)

Additional personnel
Richard Thompson - electric and 12-string guitars ("Rosie")
Sandy Denny - backing vocals ("Rosie")
Linda Peters - backing vocals ("Rosie")
Gerry Conway - drums ("Rosie",  "Knights of the Road" and "The Plainsman")
Tim Donald - drums ("Matthew, Mark, Luke & John", "Hungarian Rhapsody" and "My Girl") (born Timothy Donald, 29 September 1946, Bristol, Somerset)
Ralph McTell - acoustic guitar ("Me With You")

References

1973 albums
Fairport Convention albums
Island Records albums
A&M Records albums